Federal University Gusau, also known by the acronym FUGUS, located in Gusau Zamfara State, Nigeria was one of the last 6 proposed new universities in 2010.

The implementation of the first phase of the proposal started in February, 2011, with the establishment of nine Universities, while the second phase involving the remaining three universities including Federal University Gusau was established in 2013, during the presidency of Goodluck Jonathan. with three faculties, Humanities and Education, Management and Social Science, and Science.

Library 
The university library is located in the main campus with over 4000 volume of books with over 260 journals of both local and international which most from donation. Presently, the library collections is over 26000 volumes and almost 2000 periodicals and serial material which all support teaching, learning and research. the E-Library section has over 50 computers with internet connectivity.

Faculties and Departments

References 

  Nigerian Federal Universities

External links 
 1Push Naija

Zamfara State
Federal universities of Nigeria
Educational institutions established in 2013
2013 establishments in Nigeria